The Chrysler Airflite was a concept car created by the American car manufacturer Chrysler.  It was first introduced at the 2003 Geneva Auto Show. The Airflite's looks are a combination of a sporty design, stylish looks, and some of the design cues from another one of Chrysler's cars, the Crossfire.


Design

The Airflite was based on a shortened version of Chrysler's LX platform, which was used on the Chrysler 300. The Airflite is powered by a 90° V6 engine. The rest of the Airflite's engine power and torque is still unknown to the public.

The major styling approach of the Airflite that typically seen on a sporty two-door coupé model; however, it has the practicality and function of a four-door sedan.

The Airflite blends the design of the Chrysler Crossfire and Pacifica in its exterior design. Most of the looks of the Airflite (mainly the front and rear) were based on the Crossfire. The seven-spoke road wheel design is based on the Crossfire, as is the satin trimmed windshield.

The interior of the Airflite is very spacious and upscale. A dominant center spine connects the interior from the dashboard all the way to the back. The floor is stepped up behind the rear seats to create a raised cargo area.

Major styling cues from the Airflite eventually made it into the 2007 Chrysler Sebring sedan.

Original Airflyte
Airflite is a variation of Airflyte, which described the functional styling and monocoque construction of a car made by Nash Motors (a company that merged with Hudson Motors to form American Motors (AMC), which was acquired by Chrysler in 1987). The Nash "Airflyte" was introduced in 1949, featuring a roomy interior and an advanced design. Unusual for the time, its aerodynamic shape was developed in a wind tunnel to reduce the car's drag coefficient, which resulted in the new Nash Airflyte having a smooth, wide, and low body.

See also
Chrysler Crossfire
Chrysler Pacifica

References
Automotive Intelligence: Chrysler Airflite 
Car Design News "Chrysler Airflite concept to debut at the Geneva Motor Show", Retrieved on: July 20, 2007.

Airflite